Pader Watan was an indigenous paramilitary unit in the Soviet-backed Democratic Republic of Afghanistan (DRA).  Formed in 1983, the Pader Watan consisted of former mujahideen who defected to the DRA to form paramilitary units. They were referred to derisively as "Traitors in Turbans".

References

Military units and formations established in 1983
Paramilitary organisations based in Afghanistan